The 1935 Jacksonville State Eagle Owls football team represented Jacksonville State Teachers College (now known as Jacksonville State University) as an independent during the 1935 college football season. Led by fifth-year head coach T. B. Shotts, the Eagle Owls compiled an overall record of 2–4.

Schedule

References

Jacksonville State
Jacksonville State Gamecocks football seasons
Jacksonville State Eagle Owls football